Sergio Furlan (born 29 February 1940) is an Italian former sailor who competed in the 1964 Summer Olympics. Aged 24, he represented Italy in the Mixed Three Person Keelboat where his team placed 6th.

References

1940 births
Living people
Olympic sailors of Italy
Italian male sailors (sport)
Sailors at the 1964 Summer Olympics – Dragon